Benjamin Webster (born 28 March 1986) is an English former footballer who is last known to have played as a midfielder for Olympic Charleroi.

Career

As a youth player, Webster joined the youth academy of English Premier League side Newcastle United, before joining Västerås SK in the Swedish lower leagues.

Before the 2009 season, he signed for Finnish club MYPA after playing for Alnwick Town in the English non-league.

In 2011, he signed for Belgian fourth division team Olympic Charleroi.

References

External links
 

Expatriate footballers in Finland
Veikkausliiga players
English expatriate sportspeople in Belgium
English expatriate sportspeople in Sweden
English footballers
English expatriate footballers
English expatriate sportspeople in Finland
Myllykosken Pallo −47 players
Association football midfielders
Newcastle Blue Star F.C. players
R. Olympic Charleroi Châtelet Farciennes players
Expatriate footballers in Sweden
Expatriate footballers in Belgium
People from Alnwick
Footballers from Northumberland
1986 births
Living people